Style Savvy: Trendsetters, known as Nintendo presents: New Style Boutique in the PAL region, as {{nihongo foot|Wagamama Fashion: Girls Mode Yokubari Sengen!|わがままファッション ガールズモードよくばり宣言！||lit. Self-Indulgent Fashion: Girls Mode Avaricious Declaration!|lead=yes|group=lower-alpha}} in Japan, is a fashion video game developed by Syn Sophia and published by Nintendo and a sequel of the Nintendo DS game Style Savvy. It was released for the Nintendo 3DS on September 27, 2012 in Japan, on October 22, 2012 in North America and November 16, 2012 in Europe.

An updated version,  was released for retail in Japan on April 17, 2014. In January 2015, Nintendo officially announced the third installment in the series, Style Savvy: Fashion Forward, to be released in the following April in Japan.

GameplayStyle Savvy: Trendsetters'' is a fashion simulation game that primarily involves selecting clothing for customers as per their needs and being a fashion superstar. The game's city is accessed from an ever-expanding map, allowing players to access their apartment, purchase new clothes and accessories from the Exhibition Hall, change their hairstyle and makeup, purchase new furniture, access their store, participate in competitions and access various locales with the purpose of activating certain events between characters. One addition to this sequel is the introduction to various choices of men's fashion.

The game also makes use of the various Nintendo 3DS features. An in-game screenshot function is supported, allowing players to take photos of a scene from the top screen at any time, saving the image as a 3D or 2D screenshot. These screenshots can then be exported to the SD card and can be viewed via the Nintendo 3DS Camera software. AR Photo Op is an additional mode which utilises the ? AR card packaged with the system to take augmented reality photographs using characters and props from the game. The Nintendo Network allows players to connect to the Fashion Plaza, where they can create and access others' Web Shops. The player's Web Shop allows them to customise the front of their store and create three outfits to sell to others, garnering additional money in-game. StreetPass is utilised to exchange Stylist Cards, which contains personalised information about your character and offers a link to the player's Web Shop. Using the Nintendo 3DS wireless local play, players can compete with up to three other players in a Wireless Fashion Show which pits players against one another to create an outfit that best matches a particular theme or style. Unlike the first game which was played vertically, Trendsetters and later games are played by holding the 3DS system horizontally.

Characters

Michaela (Evie in the PAL region version) is the owner of Mira Luna (Verano in PAL region version), who hires the player character and runs contests together with Avery.

She is an ex-model who gives the player advice.

He is an announcer who hosts fashion contests.

She is an ex-employee of Mira Luna who frequently shops there.

He is the owner of a local furniture shop.

She is a hairstylist.

She is a makeup artist who works at her grandmother's old studio near the player character's boutique.

Notes

References

External links
Official NA Style Savvy: Trendsetters website
Official EU Nintendo presents: New Style Boutique website
 Official JP Wagamama Fashion: Girls Mode Yokubari Sengen website at Nintendo.co.jp

2012 video games
2013 video games
Nintendo games
Nintendo 3DS games
Nintendo 3DS eShop games
Nintendo 3DS-only games
Nintendo Network games
Simulation video games
Syn Sophia games
Video games developed in Japan
Casual games
Multiplayer and single-player video games